The Pakistan Armed Forces are the military forces of Pakistan. It is the world's sixth-largest military measured by active military personnel and consist of three formally uniformed services—the Army, Navy, and the Air Force, which are backed by several paramilitary forces such as the National Guard and the Civil Armed Forces. According to Global Firepower, the Pakistan Armed Forces are ranked as the 7th most powerful military in the world. A critical component to the armed forces' structure is the Strategic Plans Division Force, which is responsible for the maintenance and safeguarding of Pakistan's tactical and strategic nuclear weapons stockpile and assets. The President of Pakistan is the Commander-in-Chief of the Pakistan Armed Forces and the chain of command is organized under the Chairman of the Joint Chiefs of Staff Committee (JCSC) alongside the respective Chiefs of staffs of the Army, Navy, and Air Force. All branches are systemically coordinated during joint operations and missions under the Joint Staff Headquarters (JSHQ).

Since the 1963 Sino-Pakistan Agreement, the Pakistani military has had close relations with China, working jointly to develop the JF-17, the K-8, and various weapons systems.  China was the largest foreign supplier of military equipment to Pakistan in major arms. Both nations also cooperate on the development of their nuclear and space technology programs. The Chinese People's Liberation Army and Pakistan Armed Forces maintain a regular schedule for joint military exercises. Alongside this, the Pakistani military also maintains close relations with the United States, which gave Pakistan major non-NATO ally status in 2004. As such, Pakistan procures the bulk of its military equipment from China, the United States and its own domestic suppliers.

The Pakistan Armed Forces were formed in 1947, when Pakistan gained independence from the British Empire. Since then, they have played a decisive role in the modern history of Pakistan, most notably due to fighting major wars with India in 1947–1948, 1965 and 1971. The armed forces have seized control of the government on several occasions, consequently forming what analysts refer to as a deep state referred to as "The Establishment". The need for border management led to the creation of the National Guard and the Civil Armed Forces to deal with civil unrest in the North-West, as well as the security of border areas in Punjab and Sindh by paramilitary troops. In 2017, the Pakistan Armed Forces had approximately 654,000 active personnel, excluding 25,000–35,000+ personnel in the Strategic Plans Division Forces and 482,000 active personnel in the various paramilitary forces. The military has traditionally had a large pool of volunteers, and therefore conscription has never been brought into effect, although both the Constitution of Pakistan and supplementary legislation allow for conscription in a state of war.

Accounting for 18.3% of national government expenditure in 2021, after interest payments, Pakistan's military absorbs a large part of the country's annual budget. The armed forces are generally highly approved of in Pakistani society. Since the founding of Pakistan, the military has played a key role in holding the state together, promoting a feeling of nationhood and providing a bastion of selfless service.  Pakistan was the sixth-largest contributor to United Nations peacekeeping efforts, with 4,516 personnel deployed overseas. Other foreign deployments have consisted of Pakistani military personnel serving as military advisers in various African and Arab countries. The Pakistani military has maintained combat divisions and brigade-strength presences in some Arab states during the Arab–Israeli Wars, aided American-led coalition forces in the first Gulf War against Iraq, and actively taken part in the Somali and Bosnian conflicts.

History

The Pakistani military traces its roots directly back to the British Indian Army, in which many British Indian Muslims served during World War I and World War II, prior to the Partition of India in 1947. Upon Partition, military formations with a Muslim-majority (such as the Indian Army's infantry Muslim regiments) were transferred to the new Dominion of Pakistan, while on an individual basis, Indian Muslims could choose to transfer their allegiance and service to the Pakistan Armed Forces (consisting of the Pakistan Army, Royal Pakistan Navy and Royal Pakistan Air Force) or remain serving in the Indian Armed Forces of the Dominion of India. Significant figures who opted for the former included Ayub Khan (British Indian Army), Haji Mohammad Siddiq Choudri (Royal Indian Navy) and Asghar Khan (Royal Indian Air Force). Many of the senior officers who would form the Pakistan Armed Forces had fought with British forces in World War II, thus providing the newly created country with the professionalism, experience and leadership it would need in its future wars against neighbouring India. In a formula arranged by the British, military resources were to be divided between India and Pakistan in a ratio of 64% going to India and 36% going to Pakistan.

The Pakistani military largely retained British military traditions and doctrine until 1956, when the United States dispatched a specialized Military Assistance Advisory Group to Pakistan to build its military; from this point onward, American military tradition and doctrine became more dominant within Pakistan's armed forces. In March 1956, the order of precedence of the Pakistani military's three formal services changed from "Navy-Army-Air Force" to "Army-Navy-Air Force".

Between 1947 and 1971, Pakistan fought three direct conventional wars against India, with the Indo-Pakistani War of 1971 witnessing the secession of East Pakistan as the independent state of Bangladesh. Rising tensions with Afghanistan in the 1960s (primarily over the Durand Line dispute) and an indirect proxy war fought against the Soviet Union throughout the 1970s and 1980s in the Soviet–Afghan War with American, British and Israeli assistance led to a sharp rise in the development of the Pakistan Armed Forces. In 1999, an extended period of intense border-skirmishing with India, the so-called Kargil War, resulted in a massive redeployment of forces in Kashmir.  the military has been conducting counter-insurgency operations along the border areas of Afghanistan, while continuing to participate in several United Nations peacekeeping operations.

Since 1957, the armed forces have taken control from the civilian government in various military coups—ostensibly to restore order in the country, citing corruption and gross inefficiency on the part of the civilian leadership. While many Pakistanis have supported these seizures of power, others have claimed that the rampant political instability, lawlessness and corruption in Pakistan are the direct consequence of consistent military rule. The budget allocation for the Pakistan Armed Forces at over 20% of the annual budget of Pakistan. Elected officials and the lawmakers have been forced to come under military rule for over 30 years of Pakistan's existence.

Organization and Command Structure
Leadership of the Pakistan Armed Forces is provided by the Joint Chiefs of Staff Committee (JCSC), which controls the military from the Joint staff Headquarters (JS HQ), adjacent to the Air HQ, Navy HQ, and Army General HQ (GHQ) in the vicinity of the Rawalpindi Military District, Punjab. The Joint Chiefs of Staff Committee is composed of the Chairman Joint Chiefs, the Chief of Army Staff, the Chief of Air Staff and the Chief of Naval Staff.

At the JS HQ, it forms with the office of the Engineer-in-Chief, Navy Hydrographer, Surgeon-General of each inter-service, director of JS HQ, and Director-Generals (DGs) of Inter-Services Public Relations (ISPR), Inter-Services Selection Board (ISSB), Inter-Services Intelligence (ISI), and the Strategic Plans Division Force (SPD Force).

Joint Chiefs of Staff Committee (JCSC)
Following military failures in the Indo-Pakistani War of 1971 and Bangladesh Liberation War, federal studies on civil–military relations were held by a commission led by Hamoodur Rahman, Chief Justice of Pakistan. Recommendations of the Hamoodur Rahman Commission helped establish the Joint Chiefs of Staff Committee to co-ordinate all military work and oversee joint missions and their execution during operations.

The chairmanship of the JCSC rotates among the three main service branches, with appointment by the prime minister confirmed by the president. The chairman outranks all other four-star officers; however, he does not have operational command authority over the armed forces. In his capacity as chief military adviser, he assists the prime minister and the minister of defence in exercising their command functions.

Technically, the JCSC is the highest military body; and its chairman serves as the principal staff officer (PSO) to the civilian prime minister, Cabinet, National Security Council (its adviser), and president. The JCSC deals with joint military planning, joint training, integrated joint logistics, and provides strategic directions for the armed forces; it periodically reviews the role, size, and condition of the three main service branches; and it advises the civilian government on strategic communications, industrial mobilisations plans, and formulating defence plans. In many ways, the JCSC provides an important link to understand, maintain balance, and resolve conflicts between military and political circles. In times of peace, the JCSC's principle functions are to conduct planning of civil–military input; in times of war, the chairman acts as principal military adviser to the prime minister in the supervision and conduct of joint warfare.

Joint Chiefs of Staff Committee

Service branches

Army

After the partitioning of British India in 1947, the Pakistan Army was formed by Indian Muslim officers serving in the British Indian Army. The largest branch of the nation's military, it is a professional, volunteer fighting force, with about 550,000 active personnel and 500,000 reserves (though estimates vary widely). Although, the Constitution provides a basis for the service draft, conscription has never been imposed in Pakistan. A single command structure known as General Headquarters (GHQ) is based at Rawalpindi Cantt, adjacent to the Joint staff HQ. The army is commanded by the Chief of Army Staff (COAS), by statute a four-star army general, appointed by the president with the consultation and confirmation of the prime minister.  General Qamar Javed Bajwa was the chief of army staff. Army General Nadeem Raza is the current Chairman Joint Chiefs of Staff Committee. The army has a wide range of corporate (e.g.: Fauji Foundation), commercial (e.g.: Askari Bank), and political interests, and on many occasions has seized control of the civilian government to restore order in the country.

The Army Aviation Corps reportedly operates about 250 aircraft, including approximately 40 AH-1 Cobra combat helicopters. The Army Strategic Forces Command operates a wide range of missile systems in its arsenal. In spite of the Pressler amendment enforced in the 1990s, the army has been focused on development of land-based weapon systems and production of military hardware. Domestic innovation resulted in the successful development of G3A3 rifles, Anza missile systems, and Al-Zarrar and Al-Khalid main battle tanks (MBTs).

Since 1947, the army has waged three wars with neighbouring India, and several border skirmishes with Afghanistan. Due to Pakistan's diverse geography, the army has extensive combat experience in a variety of terrains. The army has maintained a strong presence in the Arab world during the Arab–Israeli Wars, aided the Coalition Forces in the first Gulf War, and played a major role in combat in the Bosnian war as well as rescuing trapped American soldiers in Mogadishu, Somalia in 1993. Recently, major joint-operations undertaken by the army include Operation Black Thunderstorm and Operation Rah-e-Nijat, against armed insurgents within Pakistan. The army has also been an active participant in UN peacekeeping missions.

Air Force

Brought into existence in 1947 with the establishment of the Pakistan Air Force Academy, the Pakistan Air Force (PAF) is regarded as a "powerful defence component of the country's defence." The prefix "Royal" was added in 1947, but dropped when Pakistan became an Islamic republic in 1956. The PAF is the seventh-largest air force and the largest in the Islamic world, with about 943 combat fighter jets and over 200 trainer, transport, communication, helicopter, and force-multiplier aircraft. A single command structure Air Headquarters (AHQ) is based at Islamabad. The air force is commanded by the Chief of Air Staff (CAS), by statute a four-star air chief marshal, appointed by the president, with the consultation and confirmation of the prime minister.  Air Chief Marshal Zaheer Ahmad Babar is the CAS.

In many important events in Pakistan's history, the air force has played a pivotal, influential, and crucial role in the nation's defence and national security, and promoted a sense of security in civil society. Its military significance and importance in public perception contribute to the PAF's dominance over the other major service branches. The PAF officially uses the slogan: "Second to None; fully abreast with the requisite will and mechanism to live by its standards in the coming millennium and beyond."

Historically, the air force has been heavily dependent on U.S., Chinese, and French aircraft technology to support its growth, despite impositions of the Pressler amendment. While F-16s continue to be a backbone of the air force, the local development and quick production of the JF-17 have provided an alternative route to meet its aerial combat requirements. According to PAF accounts, the air force plans to retire several of its ageing French-licensed Mirage III and Mirage 5 fighter jets.

Joint production with the Chinese Air Force of a light-weight multi-role combat aircraft and further avionics development of the JF-17 is ongoing at the Pakistan Aeronautical Complex (PAC). As of 2016, 70 JF-17s are operational and have replaced 50 Mirage IIIs and F-7Ps. The PAF plans to replace all F-7Ps and Mirage III/5 aircraft by 2020. The F-7PG will be replaced later, and the JF-17 fleet may eventually be expanded to 300 aircraft. Realizing the importance of fifth generation fighter aircraft, the PAF successfully negotiated for the procurement of approximately 36 Chinese FC-20 fighter jets – a deal worth around US$1.4 billion, signed in 2009. It was expected that the FC-20s would be delivered in 2015. In close co-ordination with Turkish Aerospace Industries, the PAC engaged in a mid-life update (MLU) program of its F-16A/Bs, approximately 26 of which are in service. In 2010, the air force procured at least 18 newly built F-16C/D Block 52s under the Peace Gate-II by the United States.

 

In 2009, the PAF enlisted two types of airborne early warning and control (AEW&C) systems aircraft: four Erieye-equipped Saab 2000s from Sweden, and six [text missing] – a Chinese AWACS based on the Shaanxi Y-8F cargo aircraft. Four Ilyushin Il-78 aerial tankers, capable of refuelling F-16, Mirage III, Mirage 5, JF-17, and FC-20 fighters, have been acquired second-hand from Ukrainian surplus stocks. The fleet of FT-5 and T-37 trainers is to be replaced with approximately 75 K-8 Karakorum intermediate jet training aircraft. Other major developments continue to be under development by the local aerospace industries; some of its electronic systems were exhibited in IDEAS 2014 held in Karachi. Since the 1960s, the PAF has held regular combat exercises, such as Exercise Saffron Bandit and Exercise High Mark, modelled on the USAF Weapons School; many authors believe the PAF is capable of mastering the methods of "toss bombing" since the 1990s.

Navy

The Pakistan Navy was formed in 1947 by the Indian Muslim officers serving in the Royal Indian Navy. The prefix "Royal" was soon added but dropped in 1956 when Pakistan became an Islamic republic. Its prime responsibility is to provide protection of nation's sea ports, marine borders, approximately 1,000 km (650 mi) of coastline, and supporting national security and peacekeeping missions. With approximately 71 commissioned warships and 36,000 active duty personnel, its operational scope has expanded to greater national and international responsibility in countering the threat of sea-based global terrorism, drug smuggling, and trafficking issues.

A single command structure known as Naval Headquarters (NHQ) is based at the Rawalpindi Cantt, adjacent to the Joint Staff HQ. The navy is commanded by the Chief of Naval Staff (CNS), who is by statute a four-star admiral, appointed by the president, with the required consultation and confirmation of the prime minister.  Admiral Muhammad Amjad Khan Niazi is the chief of naval staff.

Navy Day is celebrated on 8 September to commemorate its service in the Indo-Pakistani War of 1965. According to author Tariq Ali, the navy lost one-half of its force in the Indo-Pakistani War of 1971. The Navy heavily depended on American-built naval technology and operated a large infrastructure from 1947 to 1971. The Pressler amendment forced an embargo in the 1990s, during which the navy developed air independent propulsion (AIP) technology purchased from France and built the Agosta-class submarines; two of these (as well as one of the new frigates) were built at Pakistan's facilities in Karachi. The navy's surface fleet consists of helicopter carriers, destroyers, frigates, amphibious assault ships, patrol ships, mine-countermeasures, and miscellaneous vessels. Established in 1972, the Naval Air Arm provides fleet air defence, maritime reconnaissance, and anti-submarine warfare capability. Mirage 5 aircraft donated by the PAF are flown by the Navy, equipped with Exocet anti-ship missiles. The Navy's fleet of P-3C Orion turboprop aircraft, equipped with electronic intelligence (ELINT) systems, play a pivotal role in the Navy's gathering of intelligence. Since 2001, the navy has emphasised its role and expanded its operational scope across the country with the establishment of Naval Strategic Forces Command, based in Islamabad.

In the 1990s, the navy lost its opportunity to equip itself with latest technology and negotiated with the Royal Navy to acquire ageing Tariq-class destroyers in 1993–94, which continue to be extensively upgraded. During the same time, the Navy engaged in a process of self-reliance and negotiated with China for assistance. This ultimately led the introduction of F-22P Zulfiquar-class frigates, which were designed and developed at the Karachi Shipyard and Engineering Works (KSEW); at this same time, the Agosta-90B submarines were also built. Pakistan's role in the War on Terror led to a rapid modernisation, which saw the induction of the PNS Alamgir anti-submarine warship in 2011. The submarines remain to be backbone of the navy, which has been developing a nuclear submarine. Since 2001, media reports have been surfaced that the Navy has been seeking to enhance its strategic strike capability by developing naval variants of the nuclear cruise missile. An air-launched version, Ra'ad, has been successfully tested.

Since the 1990s, the navy has been conducting joint naval exercises and has participated in multinational task forces such as CTF-150 and CTF-151.

Marines

Recommended by the Navy, based on Royal Marines, the Pakistan Marines were established on 1 July 1971 to undertake riverine operations in East Pakistan. The Marines saw their first combat actions in amphibious operations during the Bangladesh Liberation War, fighting against the Indian Army. Due to poor combat performance in the war, high losses and casualties, and inability to effectively counter the Indian Army, the Marines were decommissioned by 1974. However, Marines continued to exist in its rudimentary form until 1988 to meet fundamental security requirements of Pakistan Navy units. In 1990, the Marines were recommissioned under Commander M. Obaidullah.

The Marines are the uniform service branch within the Navy whose leadership comes directly from the Navy. It shares the Navy's rank code, but conducts its combined combat training with army at Pakistan Military Academy Kakul and School of Infantry in Quetta.

Its single command structure is based at the Manora Fort in Qasim Marine Base in Karachi and the Marines are under the command of the Commander Coast (COMCOAST), by statute a two-star rear-admiral. According to the ISPR, the Marines are deployed at the southeastern regions of Pakistan to avoid infiltration and undercover activities from the Indian Army.

As of current appointment, Rear Admiral Bashir Ahmed is currently serving as the Commandant of Marines. A small number of Marine Battalions are deployed at the Sir Creek region to deter the Indian Army, and coordinated the relief efforts in the 2010 Pakistan floods. Almost an entire combat contingent of Marines were deployed in Sindh and Southern Punjab to lead the flood-relief operations in 2014.

For intelligence purposes, the army immediately raised the combat battalion of the Marines, from the officers of the Navy, in 1999. Major intelligence activities are gathered from the Sir Creek region by the Marines, where an entire battalion is deployed to conduct reconnaissance.

Coast Guards

The Pakistan Coast Guards (PCG) protects Pakistan's maritime interests and enforces maritime law, with jurisdiction over the territorial waters of Pakistan, including its contiguous zone and exclusive economic zone.

The Coast Guards works under administrative control of Ministry of Interior in close co-operation with the Pakistan Navy and the Ministry of Maritime Affairs in peace time whereas it will come under operational control of Ministry of Defense in wartime situations.

Paramilitary forces

The paramilitary forces are under various ministerial departments, and appointments are directly made from the armed forces. In a 2010 estimate, Pakistan's paramilitary personnel are approximated at 420,000. Appointments for military offices and for command of the Pakistan Rangers, Coast Guards, National Guards, and Frontier Corps are made by the army while the Navy appoints the command of the Pakistan Maritime Security Agency as part of the external billets commission. Two-star rank officers are usually appointed to command the paramilitary forces.

The PAF trains and commands the Airports Security Force for ensuring the safeguard and protection of airports in Pakistan. On some occasions, air force officers been appointed to corporate positions at Pakistan's Civil Aviation Authority as deputies.

Personnel

Troop strength
 estimations by national and international bodies were that approximately 651,800 people were on active duty in the three main service branches, with an additional 291,000 serving in paramilitary forces and 550,000 in reserve. It is an all-volunteer military, but conscription can be enacted at the request of the president with the approval of the parliament of Pakistan. The military is the sixth largest in the world and has troops deployed around the globe in military assistance and peacekeeping operations.

Pakistan is the only predominantly Muslim country in which women serve as high-ranking officers and in combat roles, and a sizeable unit of female army and air force personnel has been actively involved in military operations against Taliban forces.

Members of the Pakistani military hold a rank, either that of officer or enlisted, and can be promoted.

The following table summarises current Pakistani military staffing:

Uniforms

From 1947 to the early 2000s, Pakistan's military uniforms closely resembled those of their counterparts in the British armed services. The Army uniform consisted of plain yellowish khaki, which was the standard issue as both the combat uniform (ACU) and the service uniform (ASU). The Pakistan Air Force (PAF) uniform was primarily based on the Royal Air Force uniform, with bluish-grey as its reporting colour markings. The Navy uniform was likewise based on the Royal Navy uniform, with predominant colours of navy blue and white.

In 2003, the service uniforms for each major service branch were revised and orders were made to issue new uniforms roughly based on the American military. With Marines reestablished in 2004, the Universal Camouflage Pattern (UCP) uniforms are now worn by each service in respect to their colours; the flag of Pakistan patch worn on the shoulder became compulsory.

In the military, the service dress, however, remains yellowish khaki for the Army; plain white service dress for the Navy (excluding the Marines). The Air Force abandoned its rank and uniform structure in 2006, and introduced its own uniform insignia which closely resembled that of the Turkish Army.

The Army's standard UCP is based on a pixelated version of the region's arid desert patterns. The army's UCP varies depending on the type of missions and deployment it is being used for. The Navy's UCP is based on a design that incorporates sparse black and medium grey shapes on a light grey background. The Marines have a woodland pattern featuring light brown, olive green and dark blue shapes on a tan or light olive background. Slight colour variations have been noted. Other than a greenish flight suit and a standard service dress, the Air Forces's Airman Battle Uniform (ABU) camouflage features a variation of the six-colour desert pattern. In each service's UCP, the name of the service branch, rank, and gallantry badges are worn on the chest; insignia are worn on the shoulders with the compulsory flag-of-Pakistan patch.

Source: ISPR works, Commons

Rank and insignia structure

As Pakistan became independent, the British military ranks and insignia were initially commissioned by the armed forces as part of a legacy of British colonialism. Within a few months of its founding in 1947, the military had inherited all professional qualifications of the British military in India.

In respect to the British Indian military, the Ministry of Defence (MoD) authorised the three junior commissioned officer (JCO) pay grades between the enlisted ranks and commissioned officers. The JCO grades are equivalent to the civil bureaucracy's pay scales for those who rise by promotion from among enlisted recruits. The JCO grades in the Pakistani military are a continuation of the former Viceroy of India's commissioned pay grades during the British colonial period. Promotion to the JCO, however, remains a lucrative and powerful incentive for the enlisted military personnel; thus, if JCO ranks are ever phased out, it will probably be a slow process.

Current deployments

Within Pakistan

It is estimated that approximately 60–70% of Pakistan's military personnel are deployed along the Indo-Pakistani border. In the aftermath of the United States invasion of Afghanistan, more than 150,000 personnel were shifted towards the Tribal Areas adjacent to Afghanistan. Since 2004, Pakistan's military forces have been engaged in military efforts against al-Qaeda extremists.

In comparison with multinational and US forces, Pakistan's military has suffered the highest number of casualties in the war on terror, both in confrontations with al-Qaeda and during border skirmishes with the United States. After the 2008 Mumbai attacks and the subsequent standoff with India, several combat divisions were redeployed to Eastern and Southern Pakistan.

In addition to its military deployments, the armed forces also assist the government in responding to natural disasters such as the 2005 Kashmir earthquake and the nationwide floods of 2010.

Overseas

A large number of Pakistan Armed Forces personnel are deployed overseas as part of the United Nations' peacekeeping missions. As of May 2019, 5,083 personnel were serving abroad, making Pakistan the sixth-largest contributor of personnel to UN peacekeeping missions.

Foreign military relations

China

China's relationship with Pakistan holds great importance for both countries in terms of common interest and geopolitical strategy. The alliance was initially formed to counter the regional influence and military threat posed by India and the Soviet Union. In recent years the friendship has deepened further: China and Pakistan have signed several mutual-defence treaties.

China has been a steady source of military equipment and has cooperated with Pakistan in setting-up weapons production and modernisation facilities.

The two countries are actively involved in several joint projects to enhance each other's military needs, including development and production of the JF-17 Thunder fighter jet, the K-8 Karakorum advanced training aircraft, the Al-Khalid tank, airborne early warning and control (AEW&C) systems, and many other projects. The two countries have held several joint military exercises to enhance co-operation between their armed forces. China is also the largest investor in the Gwadar Deep Sea Port, which is strategically located at the mouth of the Strait of Hormuz.

South Asian countries

Prior to 1971, Pakistan's military had a strong presence in East Pakistan and an active theatre-level military command. After Bangladesh's independence from Pakistan, full diplomatic relations were not restored until 1976. Relations improved considerably under the Bangladesh military governments of President Major Ziaur Rahman and General Hossain Mohammad Ershad, as Bangladesh had grown distant from its former war ally, India. Common concerns over India's regional power have influenced strategic co-operation, leading to a gift of several squadrons of F-6 fighter aircraft to the Bangladesh Air Force in the late 1980s.

After being condemned by India, Great Britain, and the United States between 2004 and 2006 for repressing democracy, the Nepalese monarchy developed military ties with China and Pakistan, who offered extensive support, arms, and equipment for the monarchy's struggle to stay in power in the face of a Maoist insurgency.

When India proved reluctant to supply Sri Lanka with weapons, the insurgency-plagued island nation turned to Pakistan. In May 2000, with separatist Tamil Tiger rebels about to recapture their former capital of Jaffna, Pakistan President Musharraf provided millions of dollars of much-needed armament to the Sri Lankan government. In May 2008, Lt-Gen Fonseka of the Sri Lanka Army held talks with his Pakistan Army counterparts regarding the sale of military equipment, weapons, and ammunition. The sale of 22 Al-Khalid main battle tanks to the Sri Lanka Army was finalised during these talks, in a deal worth over US$100 million. In April 2009, Sri Lanka requested $25 million worth of 81 mm, 120 mm and 130 mm mortar ammunition, to be delivered within a month, which proved decisive in the defeat of the Tamil Tigers.

United States and NATO

Throughout its history, Pakistan has had a fluctuating military relationship with the United States. During times of co-operation, US military funding and training have enhanced the Pakistan Armed Forces; in contrast, severing of US support at critical junctures has led to bitter disillusionment. These wide swings of fortune are something to which the Pakistanis have become accustomed, and they recognise that, whatever the provocation, the relationship with the United States has too much potential benefit to be discarded lightly.

In support of the United States' 2001 invasion of Afghanistan, Pakistan's armed forces received large amounts of military aid, funding, and training. According to Ministry of Finance calculations, in the three years prior to the 11 September attacks, Pakistan received approximately $9 million in American military aid; in the three years after, the amount increased to $4.2 billion.

Pakistan has maintained strong military-to-military relations with the 30 member states of the North Atlantic Treaty Organization (NATO). NATO regards its relations with Pakistan as "partners across the globe." With the support of US Secretary of State Colin Powell, Pakistan was designated a "major non-NATO ally" in 2004. After the United States troops withdraws Afghanistan in 2021, US ‘clearly distanced’ itself from Pakistan.

Since the 2000s, military relations have improved between the Russian armed forces and the Pakistan armed forces.

Middle Eastern countries

Pakistan's close ties to the nations of the Middle East, based on geography and shared religion, have led to periodic military deployments since the 1960s. The Arab world countries – many of them wealthy but with small populations and limited militaries – have historically depended on regional armies to provide a protective umbrella and military muscle in times of instability and crisis. The Pakistani military has retained a particularly close relationship with Saudi Arabia which has been a sporadically generous patron: much of the military equipment bought from the United States by Pakistan in the 1980s was paid for by Saudi Arabia. The United Arab Emirates (UAE) and Kuwait also have been important sources of financial support.

Pakistani military personnel have been posted as military advisers and instructors to the militaries of Saudi Arabia, Jordan, Syria, Libya, Kuwait, and the UAE. Pakistan Air Force, Navy, and Army personnel played crucial roles in building the UAE military. Many Arab military officials have been educated at Pakistan's military staff colleges and universities. A combat division commanded by Major-General Zia-ul-Haq was instrumental in putting down the Palestinian Black September revolt against King Hussein in Jordan in the early 1970s.

Pakistan has enjoyed strong military co-operation with the Iranian military since the 1950s. Iranian leader Mohammad Reza Shah provided free fuel to PAF fighter jets in the Indo-Pakistani War of 1965, allowing Pakistani planes to land at Iranian Air Force bases, refuel, and take off. The military relationship continued even after the Iranian revolution, as Pakistan was among the first countries to recognise the new Iranian government. In the aftermath of the hostage crisis in Tehran, the United States severed its ties with Iran, leading Iran to send its military officers and personnel to be educated at Pakistani military academies. Relations became difficult following the Soviet–Afghan War, when hundreds of foreign fighters (mostly Sunni Arabs) arrived in Pakistan to take part in the Afghan Jihad. Pakistan President Zia-ul-Haq's military administration policy reflected extremist views towards the Shiites and caused religious tensions to rise between Sunni and Shiites in Pakistan, much to the discomfort of Iran. During the Iran–Iraq War, the Arab countries and the United States, who were supporting Iraq, pressured Pakistan to discontinue its covert support and military funding for Iran.

The 1980s were a difficult time in military relations for both countries, as Iran was blamed for the rising ethnic tensions between Sunnis and Shiites in Pakistan. The relationship further deteriorated in the 1990s when the Taliban, with Pakistan's support, began their rule of Afghanistan. In 1998, Iran and Afghanistan were on the verge of war over the assassination of Iranian diplomats. Iran's relations with India improved during this time, with both supporting the Northern Alliance against the Taliban.

The situation began to normalise in 2000, with Pakistan and Iran reinstating trade relations. In the wake of the 11 September attacks in the United States and the fall of the Taliban government in Afghanistan, the two countries began rebuilding their military ties. Over the years, diplomatic delegations have been exchanged, and Pakistan has agreed to sell military equipment to Iran. In addition, Pakistan has maintained strong military-to-military ties with Turkey, and would like to use these, as well as its Iranian connections, as a bridge to the new Muslim states of Central Asia.

Special operations forces

After the Indo-Pakistani War of 1947, recommendations for establishing an elite commando division within the army were accepted. Commissioned in 1956 with help from US Army Special Forces, the Pakistan Army's Special Services Group (SSG) is an elite special operations division; its training and nature of operations are roughly equivalent to British Special Air Service (SAS) and US Army Special Forces and Delta Force. Tentative estimates of the division's size are put at four battalions but the actual strength is kept highly classified.

With the successful commissioning of Special Services Group, the Pakistan Navy accepted recommendations for commissioning its own special operational unit shortly after the Indo-Pakistani War of 1965. Established as Special Service Group Navy (SSGN) in 1966, it is an elite and secretive commando division whose training and combat operations are similar to the Royal Navy's Special Boat Service and US Navy's Special Warfare Development Group (DEVGRU) and Sea, Air, Land (SEAL) teams. Operatives' identities and actual static strength are kept secret and classified. Very few details of their missions are publicly known.

A small unit of Pakistan Marines have, since 1990, operated reconnaissance units to deter the Indian Army's actions in the Sir Creek region. Other battalions of Marines are trained to carry out operations with airborne, heliborne, submarine, and waterborne insertions and extractions.

The Special Service Wing (SSW) is the newest special operations commando division, established by the Pakistan Air Force in 2004, in the wake of challenges posed by the Afghanistan war. The unit was active earlier and had seen action during the Indo-Pakistani War of 1947, 1965, and 1971. The SSW is designed to execute difficult aerial and land operations, serving as equivalent to the US Air Force's Special Tactics Squadron units. Following the secretive tradition of its counterparts in other services, the actual number of its serving personnel is kept classified.

UN peacekeeping forces

In 2009, Pakistan was the single largest contributor of UN peacekeeping forces, with more than 11,000 Pakistani military personnel serving in UN peacekeeping operations worldwide.

The table below shows the current deployment of Pakistani Forces in UN Peacekeeping missions.

 The total number of troops serving in peacekeeping missions was 10,173

Involvement in Pakistani civil society

According to the views of Russian scholar Anatol Lieven, the Pakistan Armed Forces play a vital role in keeping the Pakistani state together, promoting a spirit of unity and nationhood, and providing a bastion of selfless service to the nation. As an institution, the armed forces have been integrated into Pakistani civil society since the establishment of the country in 1947. The military has been involved in building much of the country's infrastructure (such as dams, bridges, canals, power stations, and energy projects) and civil–military input from all sections of the armed forces has helped to build a stable society and professionalism in the armed forces.

In times of natural disasters such as floods and earthquakes, army engineers, medical and logistics personnel, and the armed forces generally have played a major role in rescue, relief, and supply efforts. In 2010, armed forces personnel donated one day of salary for their flood-effected brethren.

In 1996, Chairman Joint Chiefs of Staff, General Jehangir Karamat, described the Pakistan Armed Forces' relations with civilian society:

According to 2012 reports of the National Reconstruction Bureau (NRB), around 91.1% of civilian infrastructure in the Federally Administered Tribal Area was built by the armed forces in a policy based on sustainable development plans, to improve the livelihood of ordinary people of the region. According to Air Force statistics, the air force conducted approximately 693 relief operations in Pakistan and abroad during the fiscal period 1998–2008. The Air Force carried and distributed thousands of tons of wheat, medicines, emergency shelters, and provided assistance to rehabilitate the disaster-effected areas of the country.

During the wave of floods from 2010 to 2014, the Navy launched relief operations nationwide and provided healthcare, medicines, relief efforts, and coordinated the distribution of food in the flood-effected areas. In the Navy's own admission, it had provided  of food and relief goods to flood victims; this included 5,700 kg of ready-to-cook food, 1,000 kg of dates and 5,000 kg of food dispatched to Sukkur. The Pakistan Naval Air Arm had air dropped more than 500 kg of food and relief goods in Thal, Ghospur, and Mirpur areas.

Engineering units of the Navy built more than 87 houses distributed to the local internally displaced persons (IDPs). About 69,000 affected IDPs were treated in Navy medical camps.

Commemoration and parades
The Youm-e-Difa (English: Defence Day) – Pakistan's day in remembrance of fallen soldiers of the Indo-Pakistani war of 1965 – is observed on 6 September. Memorial services are held in the presence of Pakistan's top military and civil officials. Wreaths of flowers are laid on the graves of the fallen soldiers and ceremonies are held across the country. The change of guard ceremony takes place at Mazar-e-Quaid, where the cadets of inter-services academies present Guard of Honour and take the charge. Additionally, the Youm-e-Fizaya (Air Force Day) is celebrated on 7 September, and the Youm-e-Bahriya (Navy Day) on 8 September.

The Pakistan Armed Forces parades take place on 23 March, which is celebrated as Youm-e-Pakistan (Pakistan Day). All main service branches parade on Constitution Avenue in Islamabad, where the weapon exhibitions are televised.

Weapons of mass destruction and policy

Pakistan's development of nuclear weapons began in 1972, following the Indo-Pakistani War of 1971, with the government adopting a policy of deliberate ambiguity which was practised and observed from 1972 to 1998. Amid pressure built after India's nuclear test in 1998, Pakistan successfully conducted its first publicly announced nuclear tests in 1998: Chagai-I and Chagai-II. With these tests, Pakistan became the seventh nation to achieve the status of a nuclear power.

Under a public policy guidance, strategic weapons and projects are researched and developed entirely by civilian scientists and engineers, who also develop a wide range of delivery systems. On military policy issues, Pakistan issues directives towards "first use" and maintains that its program is based on nuclear deterrence, to peacefully discourage attack by India and other countries with large conventional-force advantages over Pakistan. According to United States military sources, Pakistan has achieved survivability in a possible nuclear conflict through second strike capability. Since the early 1990s, Pakistan's nuclear strategists have emphasised attaining "second strike" capability in spite of their "first use" policy. Statements and physical actions by Pakistan have cited the survivability through a second strike, forming a naval-based command and control system to serve as "the custodian of the nation's second-strike capability."

In January 2000, the head of United States Central Command, General Anthony Zinni, told NBC that longtime assumptions that India had an edge in the South Asian strategic balance of power were questionable at best. Said Zinni: "Don't assume that the Pakistanis' nuclear capability is inferior to the Indians".

Despite international pressure, Pakistan has refused to sign either the Nuclear Non-Proliferation Treaty or the Comprehensive Nuclear Test Ban Treaty. Initiatives taken towards consolidating strategic infrastructure led to the establishment, in 2000, of the Nuclear Command Authority (NCA), which oversees the policy, military control, development, and deployment of the country's tactical and strategic nuclear arsenals. The command and control of the strategic arsenal are kept under an inter-service strategic command which reports directly at the Joint staff HQ.

Since its establishment in 2000, the chairperson of the NCA has been the Prime Minister of Pakistan. The NCA supervises and forms a tight control of the strategic organisations related to the research and development in Weapons of Mass Destruction (WMD). Pakistan has an extremely strict command and control system over its strategic assets, which is based on C4ISTAR (Command, Control, Communications, and Computing of Intelligence, Surveillance, Target Acquisition, and Reconnaissance) which is kept under the Air Force. The Islamabad-based Strategic Force Organization (SFO) has a three-tier system which forms by combining the Nuclear Command Authority, Strategic Plans Division Force (SPD Force), and each of three Inter-Services strategic force commands. The SPD's own force called SPD Force is responsible for security of nuclear weapons while the strategic forces commands of the air force, army, and navy exercise the deployments and eventual usage of the WMDs. However, the executive decisions, operational plannings, and controls over the WMDs remains vested with the NCA under the Prime Minister of Pakistan.

Defence Intelligence cycle

Inter-Services Intelligence (ISI) is the premier intelligence service of Pakistan that is responsible for providing, managing, and co-ordinating military intelligence for the Pakistan Armed Forces. After an eminent intelligence failure in the Indo-Pakistani War of 1947, the ISI was established by Army Major-General R. Cawthome and Navy Commander S.M. Ahsan, in a view to co-ordinate military intelligence from each major service branch and provide an inter-service intelligence estimate. While intelligence operatives are recruited from each service, including civilians, the ISI has become very powerful and influential. Due to its wide range of intelligence operations and influence, the ISI has been criticised both internally and externally. The Director General for Inter-Services Intelligence is the head of the ISI and also the principal adviser to the Prime Minister and President of Pakistan; the ISI reports directly to the prime minister.

The Directorate of Military Intelligence (MI) provides intelligence to the Army, while the other main branches are served by Naval Intelligence and Air Intelligence. The intelligence services in each branch are tasked with providing intelligence on foreign operations, performing counterintelligence operations, and identifying and eliminating sleeper cells, foreign agents and other anti-Pakistani elements within Pakistan. Additional functions involve monitoring high-level military and political leaders and safe-guarding critical military and non-military facilities. The director-generals of each intelligence branch are usually two-star officers.

Traditionally, the bulk of intelligence work and efforts in Pakistan has been carried out by the ISI, the Intelligence Bureau (IB), and the Federal Investigation Agency (FIA) as well as the others in the Pakistani intelligence community. To provide better co-ordination and eliminate competition, the National Intelligence Directorate (NID) was established in 2014. The NID serves a similar purpose as the U.S. National Intelligence Estimate, providing statistical analysis and counter-insurgency recommendations at all levels of command.

Military academies

The military academies are:

Pakistan Military Academy
Pakistan Air Force Academy
Pakistan Naval Academy

There are also a number of engineering, professional, and higher education military institutes:

National Defence University
Command and Staff College
PAF Air War College
Combat Commanders' School
Pakistan Naval War College
Military College of Engineering
College of Electrical and Mechanical Engineering
Army Medical College
Military College of Signals
College of Aeronautical Engineering
College of Flying Training
Pakistan Navy Engineering College
Air University
Fauji University
Bahria University

Military justice system

Pakistan's military justice system rests on the inter-services administrated Judge Advocate General Branch (JAG); all military criminal cases are overseen by the high-ranking officials of joint tribunals of the military. Each major service branch has its own service law: Army Justice Act, promulgated in 1952; the PAF Justice Act, established in 1953; and the Navy Ordinance, enacted in 1961. The identities of active-duty uniformed JAG officials are kept classified and no details of such individuals are made available to media.

All three sets of service laws are administered by the individual major service branches under the central reporting supervision of the Ministry of Defence (MoD). The army has a four-tier system while the air force and navy have three-tier systems. The two top levels of all three-tier systems are the general court-martial and district court-martial; the third level comprises the field general court-martial in the army, air force, and navy. The fourth-level tier of the army comprises the summary court-martial. The differences in tier levels reflect whether their competence extends to officers or enlisted personnel, and the severity of the punishment that may be imposed.

Pakistan's Supreme Court and the civilian courts cannot question decisions handed down by the military judges, and double jeopardy is prohibited. In cases where a member of the military is alleged to have committed a crime against a civilian, then the MoD and Ministry of Justice (MoJ) determine the prosecution of the case to be tried, whether military or civilian courts have jurisdiction. Former servicemen in civilian life who are accused of felonies committed while on active duty are liable for prosecution under the jurisdiction of military courts. These courts are empowered to dispense a wide range of punishments including death. All sentences of imprisonment are served in military prisons or detention barracks.

Weapons industry

Budget

At the time of the creation of Pakistan, the country had virtually no military industry or production capability. In 1949–50, the contribution of the industrial sector to the GNP was only 5.8%, of which 4.8% was attributed to small-scale industries. The new nation's only major heavy-industry operation was the Karachi Shipyard and Engineering Works (KSEW), which was focused on civil maritime construction. All military industrial materials and weapons systems were either inherited or purchased from the United Kingdom.

By 1951, Prime Minister Liaquat Ali Khan had established the Pakistan Ordnance Factory (POF) in Wah Military District, with a civilian chemist, Dr. Abdul Hafeez, serving as director and senior scientist. The POF was oriented towards the production of small arms, ammunition, and chemical explosives. During the period of reliance on United States supply, from 1955 to 1964, there was little attention given to domestic production. Almost all military weapons and equipment were provided by the United States, as part of Pakistan's membership in South East Asian Treaty Organization (SEATO) and Central Treaty Organization (CENTO). By 1963, the Defence Science and Technology Organization (DESTO) was formed by POF Director Hafeez for the purposes of military research and development. After U.S. military assistance was cut off in the Indo-Pakistani War of 1965 (followed by the disastrous 1971 War), Pakistan turned to China for help in expanding its military industrial and production capabilities, including the modernisation of the facilities at Wah.

Faced with defence and security issues involving much larger opponents on both its eastern and western borders, the Ministry of Defence and Ministry of Finance require a disproportionate share of the nation's resources to maintain even a minimally effective defensive stance. Since 1971, the military budget of the armed forces grew by 200% in support of armed forces contingency operations. During the administrations of Prime Ministers Benazir Bhutto and Nawaz Sharif, approximately 50–60% of scientific research and funding went to military efforts.

In 1993, Benazir Bhutto's defence budget for the year was set at P₨.94 billion (US$3.3 billion), which represented 27% of the government's circular spending and 8.9% of GDP, in calculations shown by the United States military. Despite criticism from the country's influential political-science sphere, the government increased the military budget by an additional 11% for the fiscal year 2015–16.

Defence contractors and explosive engineering

During the Indo-Pakistani War of 1971, the US Congress scrutinised its military aid to Pakistan despite efforts by U.S. President Richard Nixon. After the war, programs on self-reliance and domestic production were launched with the establishment of the Ministry of Defence Production (MoDP) in 1972, aiming to promote and co-ordinate the patchwork of military production facilities which had developed since independence. New military policy oversaw the establishment of Heavy Industries Taxila (HIT) in Taxila and the Pakistan Aeronautical Complex (PAC) in Kamra, north of Islamabad. The militarisation of the Karachi Shipyard Engineering Works (KSEW) took place the same year. The PAC reverse-engineered several F–6J, F–7P, Mirage III, and Mirage 5 fighter jets (of the Chinese and French), built the Mushshak trainer (based on the Swedish SAAB Safari), and maintained radar and avionics equipment. After the success of the Mushshak, the Super Mushshak and the state-of-art Karakoram-8 advanced training jet were produced. The MoDP includes seven other specialised organizations devoted to research and development, production, and administration.

In 1987, the KSEW began developing submarine technology and rebuilding the submarine base near Port Qasim. In the 1990s, concerns over Pakistan's secretive development of nuclear weapons led to the "Pressler amendment" (introduced by US Senator Larry Pressler) and an economic and military embargo. This caused a great panic in the Pakistan Armed Forces and each major service branch launched its own military-industrial programs.

By 1999, the KSEW had built its first long-range attack submarine, the Agosta 90B, which featured air-independent propulsion (AIP) technology purchased from France in 1995. By early 2000, a joint venture with China led to the introduction of the JF-17 fighter jet (developed at PAC) and the Al-Khalid main battle tank, built and assembled at HIT. Since 2001, Pakistan has taken major steps toward becoming self-sufficient in aircraft overhaul and modernisation and tank and helicopter sales.

After the success of its major projects in the defence industry, the Defence Export Promotion Organization (DEPO) was created to promote Pakistani defence equipment to the world by hosting the International Defence Exhibition and Seminar (IDEAS), which is held biennially at the Karachi expo center. Pakistan's defence exports were reportedly worth over US$200 million in 2006, and have continued to grow since.

Awards and Honours

Wartime Gallantry Awards

See also

 List of missiles of Pakistan
 Defence industry of Pakistan
 Military exercises of Pakistan
 Pakistan Armed Forces Band
 Pakistan Armed Forces deployments
 Women in the Pakistan Armed Forces
 Space & Upper Atmosphere Research Commission

References

Further reading
 
 
 Ayub, Muhammad (2005). An army, Its Role and Rule: A History of the Pakistan Army from Independence to Kargil, 1947–1999. RoseDog Books. .

External links

Official websites
 
 
 
 
 
 
 

1947 establishments in Pakistan
 
Military units and formations established in 1947
Armed Forces